Motherland is the third studio album from Italian Progressive metal band Daedalus.

Roland Grapow (of Helloween and Masterplan) mixed the recordings and played the guitar solo on the song Underground. Nerve Design (previously seen with Threshold, Extrema, Vision Divine, and Sadist) drew the album artwork.

Elisa Montaldo (of Il Tempio delle Clessidre) recorded all of the keyboard and synth sections, using her peculiar vintage sounds. Some vocal lines in "Sand" and "Empty Rooms" were recorded by Trevor (of Sadist). All the choir sections were sung by Daedalus.

The lyrics analyze from different points of view the uneasiness in today’s world.

Track listing

Personnel
Davide Merletto – vocals
Andrea Torretta – guitar
Fabio Gremo – bass
Davide La Rosa – drums

External links
 
 Official Myspace page
 Official Facebook page
 Galileo Records

Daedalus (band) albums
2011 albums